Aechmea lingulata is a plant species in the genus Aechmea. This species is native to the West Indies (Bahamas, Trinidad, Puerto Rico, Lesser Antilles etc.), Costa Rica, Panama and northern South America.

Two varieties are recognized:

Aechmea lingulata var. lingulata - most of species range
Aechmea lingulata var. patentissima (Mart. ex Schult. & Schult.f.) L.B.Sm. - eastern Brazil

References

lingulata
Flora of Central America
Flora of South America
Flora of the Caribbean
Plants described in 1753
Taxa named by Carl Linnaeus
Flora without expected TNC conservation status